In the run up to the April 2019 Spanish general election, various organisations carried out opinion polling to gauge the opinions that voters hold towards political leaders. Results of such polls are displayed in this article. The date range for these opinion polls is from the previous general election, held on 26 June 2016, to the day the next election was held, on 28 April 2019.

Preferred Prime Minister
The table below lists opinion polling on leader preferences to become Prime Minister.

Predicted Prime Minister
The table below lists opinion polling on the perceived likelihood for each leader to become Prime Minister.

Leader ratings
The table below lists opinion polling on leader ratings, on a 0–10 scale: 0 would stand for a "terrible" rating, whereas 10 would stand for "excellent".

Approval ratings
The tables below list the public approval ratings of the leaders and leading candidates of the main political parties in Spain.

Pedro Sánchez

Pablo Casado

Mariano Rajoy

Pablo Iglesias

Albert Rivera

Santiago Abascal

References